Carlana is a genus of freshwater fish in the family Characidae. It contains the single species Carlana eigenmanni, which is found in Costa Rica, Nicaragua and Panama.

C. eigenmanni is found in freshwater environments in Central America in the Pacific and Atlantic drainages from Nicaragua to Panama. This species specifically lives close to the shoreline, river backwaters, and motionless region of habitats. They can be found near vegetation. They feed mainly on algae and sometimes on aquatic insects.

The fish is named in honor of ichthyologist Carl H. Eigenmann (1863-1927), who increased the knowledge of the Characins.

References

Notes
 

Characidae
Monotypic fish genera
Fish of Central America
Fish of Panama
Taxa named by Seth Eugene Meek
Fish described in 1912